Sister, Sister is an American television sitcom starring Tia and Tamera Mowry as identical twin sisters separated at birth who are reunited as teenagers. It premiered on April 1, 1994 on ABC as part of its TGIF comedy lineup, and finished its run on The WB on May 23, 1999, airing 119 episodes over six seasons. The cast consisted of the Mowry sisters with Jackée Harry and Tim Reid costarring as their respective adoptive parents, alongside Marques Houston as their annoying neighbor Roger. RonReaco Lee and Deon Richmond later joined the cast in the fifth season.

The series was created by Kim Bass, Gary Gilbert, and Fred Shafferman, and produced by de Passe Entertainment and Paramount Network Television. As a result of ABC removing Sister, Sister from its TGIF lineup for its second season, ratings declined significantly and the network ultimately cancelled the series in April 1995. The series was then picked up by The WB as a replacement for Muscle on its Wednesday night lineup, where it aired for an additional four seasons until May 1999. In 2018, a potential revival of Sister, Sister was confirmed, but was not pursued due to a lack of interest and copyright issues.

Overview
In the pilot, the twins are reunited during a chance encounter shopping at a clothing store at the mall with their adoptive parents.

Tia Landry (Tia Mowry) is the intelligent twin from inner city Detroit, where her adoptive mother, Lisa (Jackée Harry), works as a seamstress; Tamera Campbell (Tamera Mowry) is the twin from the suburbs, where her adoptive father, Ray (Tim Reid), owns a successful limousine service. After their unexpected reunion, Ray reluctantly allows Tia and Lisa to move in because Lisa was about to take a design job in St. Louis, which would have separated the girls again. The girls' neighbor is nerdy Roger Evans (Marques Houston), an annoying teenager who is infatuated with both of them. Tia and Tamera would often break the fourth wall and address the audience. In the final season when the girls go off to college, Roger ceases to appear in the series because he was still in high school, though he does return as a guest in the final episode. By the fifth season, Tia and Tamera ended up with steady boyfriends: Tia's is Tyreke Scott (RonReaco Lee) and Tamera's is Jordan Bennett (Deon Richmond).

In the sixth-season episode "Father's Day", the twins meet their biological father Matt Sullivan (played by Tony Carriero), a white famous photojournalist who never married their mother, Racelle Gavin, because they never got the chance: she was asked to paint a mural in Florida and he was assigned "the opportunity of a lifetime" in the Middle East; when he left, Racelle told him she'd join him in Tel Aviv but never mentioned her pregnancy, and after 6 months she stopped writing. When she died, Matt wasn't allowed to see the girls because he couldn't prove he was their father, and when he searched for them later, he never found them because they had been adopted separately.

Episodes

Characters

Main

Tia Landry (Tia Mowry) is honest, responsible, mature, and a straight-A student who graduates from high school at the top of her class; she aspired to go to Harvard but was rejected and attended the University of Michigan. Mostly she and Tamera break the fourth wall to the audience about their everyday day situation. Her main boyfriend is Ray's mechanic, Tyreke Scott, who later becomes a police escort aka campus security at the University of Michigan. Their relationship started in the fifth season, though they broke up briefly in the sixth season then reunited. Tia's often involved in Tamera's schemes, and Tamera sometimes has Tia pose as her.

Tamera Anne Campbell (Tamera Mowry) is Tia's total opposite personality-wise. She is highly impulsive, less intellectual than her sister, and a big fan of Coolio. Mostly she and Tia break the fourth wall to the audience about their everyday day situation.  She meets Jordan Bennett, editor of her school's newspaper, and they start dating midway through the fifth season and their relationship grew stronger in the sixth season. Never afraid to speak her mind, she often voiced her penchant for the Hush Puppies shoe brand. 
Lisa Landry (Jackée Harry) – Tia's adoptive mother, a fashion designer; her personality is actually more aligned with Tamera's, sometimes being even more impulsive, lustful, and reckless than Tamera. She often cracks jokes throughout the episodes, typically at Ray's expense. She is prone to bouts of depression, during which she consumes high quantities of food (though it is also a running joke that she has a hearty appetite even when she is not depressed). Until season three, Lisa ran her fashion-design business, "Fashions by Lisa", out of Ray's house. In the third-season episode "History a la Carte", Lisa moves her business to a cart in a local mall, which burns down because of a faulty popcorn machine in the season four episode "Sis-Boom-Bah", after which she goes back to running her business out of Ray's house. Unlike Ray, she isn't strict with the girls, though she has her moments. She marries Victor Sims in the finale.

Ray Campbell (Tim Reid) – Tamera's widowed adoptive father. He runs his own successful limousine service. He becomes Tia's father figure and is very strict with both girls. His biggest weakness is attractive women, who often seduce him. A recurring joke is how he slips when talking to women, like saying "breast" when he means "rest" or "chardonaked" for "chardonnay". He dated Lisa for a time during the fourth season, though he and Lisa once accidentally kissed while dancing in the season-one episode "The Concert" (only to find out that they were both thinking of their high-school crushes while kissing). Though Ray is Tamera's adoptive father, he clearly aligns with Tia's personality; both are intellectual and have more dignified personalities than Lisa and Tamera. In high school he was a male cheerleader nicknamed "Ra-Ra-Ray" by his classmates. Ray is a member of Alpha Phi Alpha fraternity and the Republican Party. Ray is conservative and sometimes very cheap.
Roger Evans (Marques Houston) – is Tia and Tamera's nerdy annoying neighbor and friend. The girls frequently reject his advances (which often include sexual innuendo), and the repeated chorus by the various members of the household was "Go Home, Roger!" Roger did actually date them on different occasions (only twice by their choice); after going through a growth spurt in the season-four episode "When a Man Loves Two Women," he asks out both Tia and Tamera, along with several other girls at Roosevelt High. Roger eventually matures into the twins' confidante. Around the time the series began, Houston was a member of the R&B group Immature (later known as IMx); Houston's real-life persona was written in as his character's cousin in the season-five episode "A Friend Indeed". For a number of episodes in season 5, Roger appears infrequently with little to no explanation (Marques Houston's mother had cancer at the time). At the end of season 5, after Tia and Tamera graduate from high school, Roger is not seen or mentioned again (it is presumed that he is still in high school while Tia and Tamera are in college, as it is made clear in earlier episodes that Roger is a year younger than they are). After a long absence, he was written back into the series as he appears in the final episode as a guest at Lisa's wedding and sings a song for her. At the twins' high school graduation, Roger sings "Never Say Goodbye." It is explained that he left the show to tend to his ill mother and the fact that he was about to be written off of the show anyway because his character is a year younger than the twins made it easier for him to leave.
Tyreke Scott (RonReaco Lee) – Tyreke is Tia's boyfriend during the final two seasons of the series, though he and Tia briefly break up in the sixth season. After realizing he's still in love with Tia, he eventually gets back together with her. He is a high school drop-out, after having a run in with the law and being arrested for his older brother's grand theft auto. He eventually decides to get his GED. And, with some help from Ray, he was permitted to graduate with the girls and Jordan. He goes on to attend and get a job as a security guard at University of Michigan. He is shown to be laid-back, soft spoken and fairly mature. Still, he can be chauvinistic and temperamental at times. He appears in season 5 as a recurring cast member and is a series regular in season 6.
Jordan Bennett (Deon Richmond) – Jordan is Tamera's boyfriend during the final two seasons of the series, eventually going to college with the girls. He's goofy, outspoken and just as passionate as Tamera. He's shown to be highly intelligent and ambitious, seeing as he was class president and editor of the school paper during his senior year. We later find out that Jordan suffers from a traumatic event in his childhood, where his mother ran off with a deacon at his church. This left him bitter towards congregations, until Tamera helps ease his pain and find his faith again. He also pledges and eventually join the Gamma Psi fraternity in his college. Like Tyreke, he appears in season 5 as a recurring cast member and is a series regular in season 6.

Supporting
Tia and Tamera's real-life little brother, Tahj Mowry, has appeared in four episodes of the series. He played Tia's cousin Tahj in "Get a Job", a kid visiting a "Mall Santa" in "Christmas", and appeared in a crossover role in "Child's Play", in which he played T.J. Henderson, his character from fellow The WB sitcom Smart Guy. T.J. is a genius SAT tutor who is hired to help the girls prepare for their SAT in season five.
Sarah (Brittany Murphy) – Sarah is Tia and Tamera's best friend during the first season.  She seems to have less trouble than other people in knowing which twin was which, as seen in the season-one episode "Cheater, Cheater", in which she asks Tia why she was in Tamera's class, when Tamera asked her to take the test for her. The teacher was right behind her, and they got caught. In the episode "Smoking in the Girls' Room", she is seen smoking with the twins and two other friends. After season two, Sarah isn't seen or mentioned again. In real life, Brittany Murphy did not appear in the third season due to filming Clueless.
Terrence (Dorien Wilson) – Terrence is the manager of the local Food Boy supermarket who dated Lisa during season two and early season three and was very briefly engaged to her in the season two episode "I Do?"; he is introduced in the episode "Joey's Choice". Like Ray, many women are attracted to him, but he seems to attract more pretty women. One of the reasons he and Lisa broke up was because of his weakness for gorgeous women. In "Field Trip", she catches him flirting with a sexy clerk at a beauty shop. The character is one of only two recurring characters from the show's ABC run to appear on the show during the show's run on The WB, Anna Slotky's Denise Mondello is the other. After the season three episode "Big Twin on Campus", Terrence is never seen or mentioned again.
Steve (Victor Togunde)  – is the manager of Rocket Burger, the fast food restaurant Tia and Tamera work at during season two and early season three; Steve appears only in the second season, however. Tia and Tamera coin a song that is a play on the song "Whatta Man" by En Vogue and Salt-n-Pepa, that plays on the nickname given to him (behind his back) by Tia and Tamera and other Rocket Burger employees "Stinky Steve." In the episode "Dream Lover" in which that occurred, Tia has a recurring romantic dream about Steve that disturbs her.
Rhonda (Bianca Lawson) – Rhonda is the popular girl in Tia and Tamera's high school who always made fun of them, especially their fashion choices, but in her last appearance her attitude had become kinder, yet her physical appearance had altered. After the third season, with the exception of the season four premiere, "You Are So Beautiful" in which the girls find out that to their disbelief that Rhonda "blew up" over the summer becoming burly and mannish in appearance (the character was played by Larry Wrentz in that episode), Rhonda is not seen or mentioned again. Bianca's father, Richard Lawson, appears in the final season as Lisa's boyfriend, Victor Sims.
Denise Mondello (Anna Slotky) – Denise is one of Tia and Tamera's friends who appears in the show's second and third seasons. Denise, like Tia and Tamera, was employed at Rocket Burger. In the season two episode "Single White Teenager" (the character's first appearance in production order, though she appeared in an earlier episode in season two), Denise was paired with Tamera as a science partner while Tia was sick, and later started to dress like Tia and Tamera as well, even claiming she was going to start being called by her middle name of Tonya in order to match theirs, causing panic by Tia and Tamera, only to find out that it was a joke. The character is one of only two recurring characters from the show's ABC run to appear on the show during the show's run on The WB, Dorien Wilson's Terrence Winningham is the other.
Steve (Steve Monroe) – Steve is one of the twins' guy friends in the third season, who is depicted as being not very bright and is revealed in the episode "The Tutor" to be a player on Roosevelt High's basketball team.
Ernie (Arvie Lowe, Jr.) – Ernie is one of Tia and Tamera's guy friends in the third season, and is revealed to be a drama club member in the episode "Private School".
Jimmy "Soupy" Campbell (Sherman Hemsley) – "Soupy" is Ray's father, who was introduced in the season three episode "Grandpa Campbell", who was often in shady dealings. He states in that episode that he got the nickname "Soupy" not because his surname is Campbell (which would be a play on the Campbell's soup brand), but because of the tight situations he gets himself into, claiming "[he is] always in hot water". Ray did not have a good relationship with his father initially, and often disapproved of his decisions, but they started to have somewhat of an understanding by the end of his first appearance on the show. "Soupy" appears in two additional season three episodes "Christmas" and "Summer Bummer", and makes his final appearance in the season five episode "Shoeless", with Soupy acting as "the fairy godfather" to Tamera's Cinderella as she couldn't go to Jordan's graduation party.
Mr. Mitushka (Fred Willard) – Mr. Mitushka is the vice principal of Roosevelt High and the founder of a conservatory for young musicians. In his last two appearances, he tries a bit hard to "be cool" with the students. The character appears in the season three episodes "The Piano Lesson", "The Candidate" and "The Audition".
Dave (David Strickland)- A security guard at the mall where Lisa works. He is often shown to be slightly incompetent and loses his job in one episode.
Patrice (Vernee Watson-Johnson) – Patrice is Lisa's best friend from the inner-city neighborhood where Lisa and Tia previously lived and is the mother of Tia's childhood friend Darnell, who is introduced in the season four episode "Boy from the Hood". Patrice, who has known Lisa since childhood, has a personality similar to Lisa, which sometimes irritates Ray as much as Lisa's antics typically do.
Mike (Jamil Walker Smith) – Mike is a student at Roosevelt High, seen only during the fourth season, who is also one of the very few male friends Roger is seen to have, presumably as he is most likely in the same year.
Marlon (Aaron Lohr) – Marlon is a student at Roosevelt High, seen only during the fourth season, who is a jock and plays on Roosevelt High's hockey team as seen in the episode "Some Like It Hockey". He often makes fun of various students, most often Tia and Tamera. Marlon is shown as sexist in the episode "Some Like It Hockey" when he claims the job of class president is a "man's job" and doesn't allow Tia and Tamera (who are girls) to try out for the hockey team but the decision is later reversed when Tia and Tamera (disguised as male hockey players) beat and embarrass Marlon in a scrimmage match. The character's portrayer, Aaron Lohr, previously appeared on Sister, Sister as a different character, an older teenager whom Tia goes out on a double date with (joined by Tamera and Roger) in the season one episode "Wedding Bells and Box Boys".
Clark (Christopher "Kid" Reid) – Clark is the manager of the bookstore/coffeeshop Book 'Em, Joe and is Tia's boss at the hangout during the fifth season, who is shown to be sarcastic.
Diavian Johnson (Alexis Fields)  – Diavian is the twins' best friend in the seasons five and six. She's shown to be flirtatious, witty, loyal and a talented actress. She once got into some hot water with a recently single Tia after she saw her and Tyreke lock lips during a drama rehearsal. This led to an argument, where Diavian forced Tia to confront her feelings for her ex. The two eventually reconciled soon after. She had a boyfriend named Stephen for a time.
Dot (Senta Moses) – Dot is a friend of Tia and Tamera's during season five.
Victor Sims (Richard Lawson) – Victor is one of Ray's friends, who later becomes Lisa's love interest and later her husband in the series finale. Richard is the father of Bianca Lawson, who played Rhonda in the third season.
Vivica Shaw (Rolonda Watts) – Vivica is Ray's ex-girlfriend, who Ray broke up with because she was cheating on him. Vivica was constantly trying to mess Ray up out of anger. Because he made her lose her other date so she was dateless. She was supposed to have moved to Chicago, but she started a limo business to get him back. It is also obvious that Vivica and Lisa are rivals. In the same episode where she started the limo business she was arrested, because none of her three drivers (Kim, Mo'nique, and Chant'e) had a license.
Steven (Chad Haywood)  – Diavian's boyfriend in season five, who is shown not to be very bright.
Shawn (Gabrielle Union) - Shawn is Tia and Tamera's friend in the last half of the fourth season and the first half of the fifth season. Union appears in a season five episode prior to portraying Shawn as a girl named Vanessa, Tamera's friend who is revealed to be a shoplifter.
Simone Flosser (Rachael Harris) – A senior university student and occasional friend of the girls' during the sixth season.
Chud McGraf (Greg Pitts) – A wild and somewhat dim university student. He's shown to be friends with the younger cast during the sixth season.
Matt Sullivan (Tony Carreiro)  – Matt is Tia and Tamera's birth father. He appeared in one episode as their teacher and they came to his museum. He started talking about Racelle Gavin and they said they knew her, and he showed them a picture of her. Eventually, he figured out that Racelle Gavin was their mother, which meant he was their father. Tamera didn't believe it because he was white and he hadn't been there for them, but he tried to explain that he had tried to find them. At the end, Tamera was really happy with him. And in the end Matt accidentally took a wacky picture and Lisa said "Matt, you'll fit into this family just fine."
Principal Gordon (Eric Payne in Season 4, Fitz Houston in Season 5) – The Principal of Roosevelt High during the Twins' Junior and Senior Years.
Little Ray – Little Ray is a stray orange tabby cat that Lisa adopts during the first season and names after Ray. Ray hates Little Ray. Little Ray is shown in the second season, riding with Ray, then Ray tells him to get out and he jumps out the window, but he comes back at the end of the episode, then is never seen or mentioned again.

Special guest appearances

702
Flex Alexander
Jon B.
Milton Berle
BLACKstreet
Johnny Brown
Olivia Brown
Orlando Brown
Kobe Bryant
Sean “Puffy” Combs
Nikki Cox
Cylk Cozart
Terrell Davis
Denise Dowse
Ja'Net DuBois
Patricia Belcher
Michael Clarke Duncan
Donald Faison
Kirk Franklin
Tyrese
Nicci Gilbert
La'Myia Good 
Dorian Gregory
Rachael Harris
Pat Harvey
Sherman Hemsley
Taraji P. Henson
D. L. Hughley
Immature
Shar Jackson
Wesley Jonathan
Montell Jordan
Khalil Kain
Casey Kasem
Lisa Leslie
Phill Lewis
Rebecca Lobo
Maia Campbell
Brian McKnight
Christina Milian
Kel Mitchell
Goodie Mob
Mari Morrow
Tahj Mowry
Brittany Murphy
Mýa
Next
Mary-Kate Olsen
Ashley Olsen
Beverly Peele
Kyla Pratt
John Ratzenberger
Christopher "Kid" Reid
Daphne Maxwell Reid
Reynaldo Rey
RuPaul
Merlin Santana
Esther Scott
Molly Shannon
Chaz Lamar Shepherd
Kellita Smith
Mindy Sterling
Ethan Suplee
Raven-Symoné
Kenan Thompson
Gabrielle Union
Barry Watson
Jason Weaver
Malinda Williams
Vesta Williams
Chuck Woolery
WC
Will Smith

Production
Throughout its run, the series was filmed in front of a live studio audience at Paramount Pictures, that provided the laugh track throughout the episode and utilize applause to signal the end of an episode.

For the first five seasons, the series often had Tia and Tamera, either together or separately, break the fourth wall by talking directly to the viewer. During the ABC run, Tia and Tamera would address the audience on some of the goings on in the storyline involving them and occasionally other main characters, usually Roger. After the series moved to The WB, the breaking of the fourth wall was limited mainly to certain episodes and usually only in the teaser scenes and featured increasingly less often by the fourth season. For some of the episodes in the fifth season, it was included but was dropped by the middle of the fifth season. The sixth and final season was the only season that did not include it. Many of the episodes from the third season up to the sixth season also featured bloopers at the end of some of them, playing during the ending credits.

Theme song and opening sequences

Theme song
The series' original theme song was written and composed by Tim Heintz, Randy Petersen and Kevin Quinn. Season one was the only season using the full version, with the short middle instrumental portion, vocalizations and the line "Living underneath one roof, no it won't be trouble-proof" dropped in season 2, though the short instrumental and vocalizations were restored in season 3. Performers for this version that was played from seasons 1-4 is unknown, as no evidence is revealed at this time, though many fans believed it was either Shanice or En Vogue. An updated version of the theme song was used starting in Season 5, composed by Heintz, Petersen, Quinn and Kurt Farquhar, who composed the music score for most of the series (save for Season 3, when the score was composed by Paul A. Kreiling), and performed by Tia and Tamera Mowry; this version used the same tune, but a slower tempo and lyrics that emphasized the two characters' differences and increased maturity. The season 5 version of the theme began with the end of the original theme prior to the start of the theme song. An instrumental version of the final theme was used as a closing theme for the final two seasons, though with the exception of the episode "Designer Genes", it was generally played over a blooper reel during the closing credits.

Opening titles
The opening sequence used in the first two seasons, designed by Twin Art, opens with the sound of two smacks and crying babies over a black screen as animated crying babies appear with the word "separated" between them, then showing Ray and Lisa each holding babies, which has real-life baby pictures of Tia and Tamera, with the word "adopted" appearing between both. Throughout the sequence, the main cast is shown in front of a white background with various animations around them, at one point Tia and Tamera push Lisa and Ray  towards each other. It ends with Tia, Tamera, Ray, and Lisa at a couch with an animated roof over it (pushed overhead by Ray), which morphs into the title logo. The sequence was shortened with the theme song in season two and modified to include Marques Houston as Roger, who became a contract cast member that season (Houston, as Roger, is shown peeking from an animated door which Tia and Tamera promptly close on him).

Seasons 3 and 4 used a computer-animated sequence by Pittard-Sullivan, with the main cast's video headshots in a stop-motion effect, opening with two babies drifting away from each other into two backgrounds: one, the city (which is actually the pre-September 11, 2001 Manhattan skyline, despite the fact the series was set in Detroit) and the other, a country road with the word "separated" between them, then showing Ray and Lisa each holding babies in a similar manner as the previous sequence with a rotating "adopted", then showing the cast in front of different backdrops (some of which include cutouts of objects). It ends with Tia, Tamera, Ray, who is reading from a newspaper, and Lisa walking into each other, then getting themselves tangled together over changing cloud backdrops, one which features two roadsigns, before the title logo appears. The cast's surnames are animated and in a variant of the show's logotype. This was the only time the intro remained exactly the same, though, by season four, the intro became a bit outdated as Tia and Tamera dropped the wavy hair, tams and plaid outfits for straight hair and trendier fashions, and Roger stopped wearing braids.

The final two seasons used a music video-style sequence, designed by Paramount Digital Design; Marques Houston remained in the sequence despite his appearances on the series decreasing midway through the fifth season. For the sixth season, he was replaced in the sequence by RonReaco Lee and Deon Richmond. Because alternate takes of the same footage was used from the season before, viewers often notice that Lee and Richmond are digitally inserted in the group shots with the remaining original cast, as evidenced by a dim white glow around their bodies.

Syndication

U.S. broadcast and cable syndication
After being picked up by The WB in 1995, reruns of the first two seasons of Sister, Sister were broadcast in early primetime as part of the network's then-newly launched Sunday night lineup during the 1995–1996 season, in addition to the first-run episodes of the series that aired on the WB's Wednesday night schedule. The series has been aired on various broadcast television networks in the U.S. after the series finale. From September 1998 to September 1999, Paramount Domestic Television (now CBS Television Distribution) distributed the series to Fox, The WB and UPN network affiliates, such as WWOR-TV (who aired the show reruns weeknights at 6:30pm in New York City) around the United States, airing depending on market. In some markets such as New York City (6:30pm), Philadelphia (5:30pm), Washington, D.C. (5pm & 5:30pm), Atlanta (2:30pm), and Bakersfield (9am & 9:30am), reruns of Sister, Sister were replaced by reruns of The Hughleys in September 2002.

The series formerly aired reruns on BET, Disney Channel, ABC Family, WGN America, Up (formerly GMC TV), Centric, Hub Network, Logo TV, VH1 (In early 2021), and Fuse. The series currently airs on MTV 2.

Disney Channel airings had most episodes edited for content deemed by the channel as unsuitable for its pre-teen audience; the edited Disney Channel versions were also the syndication package of the show that aired on sister network ABC Family, with the exception of the season two episode "Tattoo" that was omitted from Disney Channel airings. GMC also airs episodes with content the channel deems inappropriate usually muted or removed entirely, ranging from mild suggestive dialogue said by Roger to tame phrases such as "shut up", "butt", "dumb" and "pervert"; whereas the airings on other channels were the original syndicated prints.

As of 2021, the series is available to stream on Netflix, Hulu, and Paramount+ in the US.

International syndication
In Australia and New Zealand, the series was aired on Nickelodeon and the Seven Network; in the United Kingdom, Sister, Sister was aired on Nickelodeon, and on Channel 4 between 1995 and 2000 as the channel had the terrestrial rights to the show. In the UK, Nickelodeon aired Sister Sister again in 2009 but only showed episodes from the first four seasons. It currently airs on Trace Vault in the UK, which also shows classic Teenage comedies like Kenan and Kel and Moesha in addition to music videos. It also aired in Ireland, on RTÉ2.

In Latin America, Sister, Sister used to air on Nickelodeon in the late 1990s and early 2000s. On October 21, 2009 it debuted on open television Rede Record, but was taken off on October 30, 2009, the cause for this is unknown.

In Spain, the TV series was aired during the late 90's and early 00's on Antena 3 on its morning first children's programme, Megatrix, renamed as Cosas de hermanas.

On October 5, 2020, the series began streaming on Netflix in a number of other countries.

Home media
CBS DVD (distributed by Paramount) released the first and second seasons of Sister, Sister on DVD in Region 1 in 2008 and 2009. As of September 2014, these releases have been discontinued and are out of print.

On May 4, 2015, it was announced that Visual Entertainment Inc. (VEI) had acquired the distribution rights to the series for Region 1 (encompassing the United States and Canada). It was subsequently announced on December 28, 2015, that VEI (through its deal with CBS Television Distribution) would release a complete DVD set of the series, Sister, Sister: The Complete Collection (which includes all six seasons), in Region 1 on January 19, 2016, the release date was then pushed back to March 18, 2016. The Mowry twins 2000 television film Seventeen Again is also included as a bonus disc on the Complete Collection set. On May 26, 2017, VEI released separate Seasons 1–3 and Seasons 4–6 sets of the series. Due to copyright issues, these releases are heavily edited.

Reception

Ratings

Awards and nominations
Emmy Awards
1998 – Outstanding Lighting Direction (Electronic) for a Comedy Series – George Spiro Dibie (Nominated)
1997 – Outstanding Lighting Direction (Electronic) for a Comedy Series – George Spiro Dibie (Nominated)
1996 – Outstanding Individual Achievement in Lighting Direction (Electronic) for a Comedy Series – George Spiro Dibie (Nominated)
1995 – Outstanding Individual Achievement in Lighting Direction (Electronic) for a Comedy Series – George Spiro Dibie (Won)

Image Awards
2000 – Outstanding Actress in a Comedy Series – Tia & Tamera Mowry (Won)
2000 – Outstanding Supporting Actress in a Comedy Series – Jackée Harry (Won)
2000 – Outstanding Supporting Actor in a Comedy Series – Tim Reid (Nominated)
1999 – Outstanding Actress in a Comedy Series – Tia & Tamera Mowry (Won)
1999 – Outstanding Supporting Actress in a Comedy Series – Jackée Harry (Won)
1999 – Outstanding Comedy Series (Nominated)
1998 – Outstanding Supporting Actor in a Comedy Series – Tim Reid (Nominated)
1996 – Outstanding Comedy Series (Nominated)
1996 – Outstanding Youth Actor/Actress – Tia & Tamera Mowry (Nominated)

Kids' Choice Awards
1998 – Favorite Television Actress – Tia & Tamera Mowry (Nominated)
1998 – Favorite Television Show (Nominated)
1997 – Favorite Television Actress – Tia & Tamera Mowry (Won)
1996 – Favorite Television Actress – Tia & Tamera Mowry (Won)
1996 – Favorite Television Show (Nominated)
1995 – Favorite Television Actress – Tia & Tamera Mowry (Won)

Young Artist Awards
1999 – Best Performance in a TV Comedy Series: Supporting Young Actor – Deon Richmond (Nominated)
1997 – Best Performance in a TV Comedy: Guest Starring Young Performer – Verner, Robin Marie (Nominated)
1997 – Best Performance in a TV Comedy: Leading Young Actress – Tia & Tamera Mowry (Nominated)
1996 – Best Performance by a Young Actress: Guest Starring Role TV Series – Selico, Krista Sherre (Nominated)
1996 – Best Performance by a Young Actress: TV Comedy Series – Tia & Tamera Mowry (Nominated)
1995 – Best Youth Comedian in a TV Show – Marques Houston (Won)
1995 – Best New Family Television Series (Nominated)
1995 – Best Youth Comedian in a TV Show – Victor Togunde (Nominated)
1995 – Best Youth Comedienne in a TV Show – Tia & Tamera Mowry (Nominated)

Teen Choice Awards
2017 – Choice Throwback Tv Show – Sister Sister (Nominated)

Potential revival
In June 2012 interview with TV Guide, both Tia Mowry and Tamera Mowry have said they would like to reunite the cast for a reunion film. They were thinking of doing a "Twins in the city" plot, like the twins in New York City.

In 2017, rumors started developing about a potential continuation of Sister, Sister, both Tia and Tamera have confirmed that talks are ongoing and that a sequel series is very close to happening.

In October 2017, Tia Mowry stated in an interview with Entertainment Tonight that a revival of the series was "definitely closer than ever" and that she is "getting excited" about the possibility. She also said that she believed Jackée Harry and Tim Reid would be a part of the revival if it were to take place.

On January 16, 2018, while appearing on Steve, Harry confirmed the revival, stating that "it's happening".

In 2019, the reboot was put on hold indefinitely. Tia commented, "To be honest with you, I hate to pop the balloon. [A revival of] Sister, Sister kind of looks dead right now," and cited rights issues as part of the reason for the reboot not moving forward.

See also
 Bluey: An animated sitcom with two sisters as the main protagonists.

References

External links
 
 

1994 American television series debuts
1999 American television series endings
1990s American black sitcoms
1990s American college television series
1990s American high school television series
1990s American teen sitcoms
1990s American sitcoms
American Broadcasting Company original programming
American television series revived after cancellation
English-language television shows
Television series by CBS Studios
Television shows set in Detroit
The WB original programming
Television duos
Television series about families
Television series about teenagers
Television series about twins
Television series about sisters
Works about twin sisters
Coming-of-age television shows